Albert Hallworth (5 January 1898 – 18 April 1962) was a British trade unionist.

Hallworth grew up in Stockport, and worked in a cotton mill from an early age.  In 1914, aged 16, he joined the Royal Fusiliers as a drummer and served throughout World War I.  He was demobbed in 1919, and began working for the London, Midland and Scottish Railway as an engine cleaner.  He was subsequently promoted to become a fireman, then a spare driver, and joined the Associated Society of Locomotive Engineers and Firemen (ASLEF).

Hallworth began working full-time for ASLEF in 1938, when he became an organising secretary, then in 1948 he was promoted to become acting assistant general secretary.  In 1955, he helped organise a major railway strike, and that year also won a seat on the General Council of the Trades Union Congress.  The following year, he was elected as general secretary of the union, serving until 1960.

References

1898 births
1962 deaths
Military personnel from Cheshire
British Army personnel of World War I
English trade unionists
General secretaries of the Associated Society of Locomotive Engineers and Firemen
Members of the General Council of the Trades Union Congress
People from Stockport
Royal Fusiliers soldiers